Jamsrangiin Mönkh-Ochir (born 12 May 1950) is a Mongolian wrestler. He competed at the 1972 Summer Olympics and the 1976 Summer Olympics.

References

External links
 

1950 births
Living people
Mongolian male sport wrestlers
Olympic wrestlers of Mongolia
Wrestlers at the 1972 Summer Olympics
Wrestlers at the 1976 Summer Olympics
Place of birth missing (living people)
21st-century Mongolian people
20th-century Mongolian people